
Gmina Sicienko is a rural gmina (administrative district) in Bydgoszcz County, Kuyavian-Pomeranian Voivodeship, in north-central Poland.

Villages
Gmina Sicienko contains the villages and settlements of Chmielewo, Dąbrówczyn, Dąbrówka Nowa, Gliszcz, Goncarzewy, Janin, Kasprowo, Kruszyn, Kruszyniec, Łukowiec, Marynin, Mochełek, Mochle, Murucin, Nowaczkowo, Osowa Góra, Pawłówek, Piotrkówko, Samsieczno, Sicienko, Sitno, Słupowo, Smolary, Strzelewo, Szczutki, Teresin, Trzciniec, Trzemiętówko, Trzemiętowo, Wierzchucice, Wierzchucinek, Wojnowo, Zawada and Zielonczyn.

Neighbouring gminas
Gmina Sicienko is bordered by the city of Bydgoszcz and by the gminas of Białe Błota, Koronowo, Mrocza, Nakło nad Notecią, Osielsko and Sośno.

References
Polish official population figures 2006

Sicienko
Bydgoszcz County